"Aya Benzer 2003" - The original version of this song is part of the Maxi Sandal 2003 / Moonlight Maxi single (EP/Hybrid album) by  Turkish singer-songwriter Mustafa Sandal.

Track listing
 Aya Benzer 2003, 2003
 Track 1: "Aya Benzer 2003 (Duet Gülcan)"  (3:59)
 Track 2: "Moonlight (Duet Gülcan)"  (3:59)
 Track 3: "Aya Benzer 2003 (Duet Gülcan)"  (3:59)
 Track 4: "Aya Benzer 2003 [Extended Version] (Duet Gülcan)"  (4:54)

Notes
Natalia was replaced on this single with Turkish-German TV personality Gülcan in the duets included in this album

Charts

References

2003 singles
Mustafa Sandal songs